Maggie Lunn (born Margaret Hilary Lunn; 26 January 1961 – 19 February 2017) was an English casting director, for leading theatre companies and for notable productions on television and film.

Life
Lunn was born in Jesmond, Newcastle upon Tyne, youngest of four children born to John Lunn, a school teacher, and Norah Lunn ( Lucey). She attended Sacred Heart Grammar School in Fenham, and read English at Newcastle University. Starting a career in journalism, she was a research assistant, at The Daily Telegraph and then at Private Eye.

Moving to casting in 1987, she was an assistant to the casting director Gill Titchmarsh, and later an agent at  International Creative Management. In 1995 she was appointed head of casting at the Royal Shakespeare Company. In 2002, she joined Michael Attenborough at the Almeida Theatre as artistic associate. From 2001 to 2002 she was acting head of casting at the Royal National Theatre. With the Royal Shakespeare Company and later, she was interested in casting black and minority ethnic actors in roles usually regarded as white, notably David Oyelowo as the king in Shakespeare's Henry VI, at the RSC in 2001.

She then became a freelance casting director and worked on TV as well as theatrical productions. This included the production of The Rivals at Bristol Old Vic in 2016 where the cast she put together was part of the success of the production. She worked with other theatre companies including the Young Vic, the Old Vic and the Chichester Festival Theatre.

Her casting decisions were influential at the start of the careers of several including David Oyelowo, Benedict Cumberbatch, Ben Whishaw, Alex Jennings, Eddie Redmayne, Eve Best, Rory Kinnear and Lucian Msamati.

On television, she was casting director for productions including Pride and Prejudice (1995), Cranford (2007) and Great Expectations (2011). In film, productions included Carrington (1995), Notes on a Scandal (2007) and Broken (2012).

Death
Maggie Lunn died of cancer in 2017, aged 56, survived by her husband, the actor Paul Jesson, and daughter Joanne from an earlier relationship. The director Rufus Norris, with whom she worked at the Almeida Theatre and later, said "To work with her was to enter a cauldron of robust and rigorous inquiry".

Theatre
Henry VI (2001), Royal Shakespeare Company, Stratford-upon-Avon
Anything Goes (2001- 2003) National Theatre, London
A Streetcar Named Desire (2001- 2003) National Theatre, London
The Coast of Utopia trilogy (Voyage, Shipwreck, Salvage) (2001- 2003) National Theatre
Festen (2004) Almeida, London
Blood Wedding (2005) Almeida, London
Hedda Gabler (2005) Almeida, London
The Government Inspector (2005) Chichester Festival Theatre, Chichester
A Moon for the Misbegotten (2006) Old Vic, London
Birdsong (2010) Comedy Theatre, London
Flare Path (2011) Haymarket, London
Rosencrantz and Guildenstern are Dead (2011) Haymarket, London  
The Tempest (2011) Haymarket, London
Bridge Project (2009 - 2012) Old Vic
A Streetcar Named Desire (2014) Young Vic, London
Speed-the-Plow (2014) Playhouse Theatre, London
High Society (2015) Old Vic, London 
The Young Chekhov trilogy (Platonov, Ivanov and The Seagull adapted by David Hare) (2015), Chichester Festival theatre, Chichester then National Theatre, London
The Rivals (2016) Bristol Old Vic, Bristol
Long Day's Journey Into Night (2016) Bristol Old Vic, Bristol

Films
Carrington (1995)
Funny Bones (1995)
Archangel (2005)
Notes on a Scandal (2006)
Broken (2012)

TV programmes
Pride and Prejudice (1995)
Cranford (2007) (BBC series) (Emmy nomination)
Oliver Twist (2007)
Robin Hood (2009) 13 episodes
Hustle (2010 - 2011) 12 episodes
Great Expectations (2011)
The Hollow Crown (2012)
Law and Order: UK (2013) Four episodes
Silent Witness (2013) Four episodes

Awards
She was nominated for one Primetime Emmy in 2007 for Cranford in the category of the casting of a miniseries, movie or a special.

References

External links
 

1961 births
2017 deaths
People from Newcastle upon Tyne
British casting directors
Women casting directors